The term exorbitant privilege (privilège exorbitant in French) refers to the benefits the United States has due to its own currency (the US dollar) being the international reserve currency. For example, the US would not face a balance of payments crisis, because their imports are purchased in their own currency. Exorbitant privilege as a concept cannot refer to currencies that have a regional reserve currency role, only to global reserve currencies.

Academically, the exorbitant privilege literature analyzes two empirical puzzles, the position puzzle and the income puzzle. The position puzzle refers to the difference between the (negative) U.S. net international investment position (NIIP) and the accumulated U.S. current account deficits, the former being much smaller than the latter. The income puzzle is that despite a deeply negative NIIP, the U.S. income balance is positive, i.e. despite having much more liabilities than assets, earned income is higher than interest expenses.

Origin
The term was coined in the 1960s by Valéry Giscard d'Estaing, then the French Minister of Finance. It is frequently mis-attributed to Charles de Gaulle, who is said to have had similar views.

Opposition in France
In the Bretton Woods system put in place in 1944, U.S. dollars were convertible to gold between countries. In France, it was called "America's exorbitant privilege" as it resulted in an "asymmetric financial system" where foreigners "see themselves supporting American living standards and subsidizing American multinationals". As American economist Barry Eichengreen summarized: "It costs only a few cents for the Bureau of Engraving and Printing to produce a $100 bill, but other countries had to pony up $100 of actual goods in order to obtain one." In February 1965, President Charles de Gaulle announced his intention to exchange its U.S. dollar reserves for gold at the official exchange rate. He sent the French Navy across the Atlantic to pick up the French reserve of gold and was followed by several countries. As it resulted in considerably reducing U.S. gold stock and U.S. economic influence, it led U.S. President Richard Nixon to end the convertibility of the dollar to gold on August 15, 1971 (the "Nixon Shock"). This was meant to be a temporary measure but the dollar became permanently a floating fiat money and in October 1976, the U.S. government officially changed the definition of the dollar; references to gold were removed from statutes.

Research
 
Over time, people have tried to prove the exorbitant privilege hypothesis, by investigating whether there is a statistically significant difference between the return on U.S. assets and liabilities. This was difficult because no time series on capital gains, which is required due to capital gains' volatility, is available. In response to this issue, two approaches have developed:
 the construction of long time series based on historical assumptions and
 a focus on specific categories for which high-quality data exists.

The first wave method consists of estimating capital gains by calculating the difference between the annual change in the U.S. international position and U.S. net capital outflows. The residual change not explained by capital flows is assumed to correspond to the capital gain.

The second wave of research on the returns differentials literature, published during the financial crisis of 2007–08, emerged due to criticism of how the data was handled. This criticism alleged inconsistencies in data revisions between stocks and flows, which were then (mis-)attributed to "Other changes". Consequently, it was argued that this estimation approach would not calculate capital gains, but rather the sum of capital gains and other changes. Another problem is the extent of gains in the FDI category, wherein data is estimated. The second wave addresses these issues and finds substantially smaller differentials, ranging from -0.7% to 0.6%, using the second research approach.

The recent availability of new data spawned a third wave of research on returns differentials. This literature found comparatively high return differentials ranging up to 6.9% and attributed the difference more to differentials in capital gains than to those in yields. Revised estimates for  accounting for the exchange rate effect find a difference of 4.6%, especially in FDI.

The phrase became the title of a 2010 book by economist Barry Eichengreen, examining the future prospects for the US dollar's dominance in international trade.

See also
 Demurrage
 Reserve currency
 Seigniorage

References

Literature

 
 
 
 
 
 
 
 
 
 
 
 
 
 
 
 
 
 
 

Economic puzzles
Economy of the United States
Foreign exchange market
Monetary hegemony